Wairarapa North is a former New Zealand parliamentary electorate, from 1881 to 1887.

Population centres
The previous electoral redistribution was undertaken in 1875 for the 1875–1876 election. In the six years since, New Zealand's European population had increased by 65%. In the 1881 electoral redistribution, the House of Representatives increased the number of European representatives to 91 (up from 84 since the 1875–76 election). The number of Māori electorates was held at four. The House further decided that electorates should not have more than one representative, which led to 35 new electorates being formed, including Wairarapa North, and two electorates that had previously been abolished to be recreated. This necessitated a major disruption to existing boundaries.

Wairarapa North was centred on the largest Wairarapa town of Masterton, with its southern boundary south of Masterton.

History
These electorates existed for two elections from 1881 to 1887, when Wairarapa North was renamed Masterton, and Wairarapa South became the new Wairarapa electorate.

Between 1871 and 1881, the previous Wairarapa electorate had been a two-member electorate. The other incumbent, George Beetham, was challenged by Alfred Renall in the Wairarapa North electorate. Beetham and Renall received 670 and 351 votes, respectively, and Beetham was thus declared elected.

Beetham and McCardle received 542 and 517 votes, respectively.

In 1887, when Wairarapa North was abolished, Beetham became the MP for the new  electorate.

Election results
Wairarapa North was represented by one MP for all six years.

Key

Notes

References

Historical electorates of New Zealand
Politics of the Wellington Region
Wairarapa
1881 establishments in New Zealand
1887 disestablishments in New Zealand